The Reserve Defence Forces Representative Association (RDFRA) is the representative body for all ranks of the Reserve Defence Forces (RDF) in Ireland.

RDFRA was founded in 1992 and is responsible for representing and furthering the interests of active service members of the Irish Reserve Defence Forces, which is made up of the Army Reserve (AR) and Naval Service Reserve (NSR). Membership is open to all officer and other ranked personnel of the Reserve. Funding comes from government subvention and annual membership deductions.

The RDFRA National Office is located in Clarke Barracks at the Defence Forces Training Centre (DFTC) in the Curragh Camp, County Kildare.

See also
Permanent Defence Force Other Ranks Representative Association (PDFORRA)
Representative Association of Commissioned Officers (RACO)
Ombudsman for the Defence Forces (ODF)

References

External links
RDFRA website

Military of the Republic of Ireland
1992 establishments in Ireland